The Europe/Africa Zone was one of three zones of regional competition in the 2015 Fed Cup .

Group I 
 Venue: Syma Sport and Events Centre, Budapest, Hungary (indoor hard)
 Date: 4–7 February

The sixteen teams were divided into four pools of four teams. The four pool winners will take part in play-offs to determine the two nations advancing to the World Group II play-offs. The nations finishing last in their pools will take part in relegation play-offs, with the two losing nations being relegated to Group II for 2016.

Pools

Play-offs 

 and  advanced to World Group II play-offs.

Group II 
 Venue: Tere Tenniscentre, Tallinn, Estonia (indoor hard)
 Dates: 4–7 February

The eight teams were divided into two pools of four teams. The two nations placing first and second will take part in play-offs to determine the two nations advancing to Group I. The nations finishing last in their pools will take part in relegation play-offs, with the two losing nations being relegated to Group III for 2016.

Pools

Play-offs 

  and  advanced to Europe/Africa Group I in 2016.

Group III 

 Venue: Bellevue, Ulcinj, Montenegro (outdoor clay)
 Dates: 13–18 April

Pools

Play-offs 

  and  advanced to Europe/Africa Group II in 2016.

References 

 Fed Cup Result, 2015 Europe/Africa Group I
 Fed Cup Result, 2015 Europe/Africa Group II
 Fed Cup Result, 2015 Europe/Africa Group III

External links 
 Fed Cup website

 
Europe Africa
International sports competitions in Budapest
Tennis tournaments in Hungary
Sports competitions in Tallinn
Tennis tournaments in Estonia
Tennis tournaments in Montenegro
21st century in Tallinn
2000s in Budapest
February 2015 sports events in Europe
April 2015 sports events in Europe